Nico Pasquotti (born 18 October 1995) is a Canadian soccer player.

Club career

Calgary Foothills
In 2016, Pasquotti made twelve appearances for USL Premier Development League side Calgary Foothills, scoring one goal. That fall he attended the University of Lethbridge, where he made fourteen appearances and scored one goal. In 2017, Pasquotti made another thirteen appearances for Foothills.

In 2018, Pasquotti made thirteen league appearances, scoring three goals. In the playoffs that year, he appeared in four playoff matches and scored the game-winning goal as the Foothills went on to win the PDL Championship. Pasquotti was subsequently named MVP of the 2018 PDL Championship.

Cavalry FC
On 23 January 2019, Pasquotti signed with Canadian Premier League side Cavalry FC, rejoining former Calgary Foothills coach Tommy Wheeldon Jr. and several of his Foothills teammates. On 8 May 2019, he made his professional debut as a substitute against Valour FC. Pasquotti scored his first goal for Cavalry on May 12 against Forge FC.  Pasquotti's first season with Cavalry was quite personally successful despite his side losing to Forge in the 2019 Canadian Premier League Finals: he became a mainstay in the starting eleven, contributed 5 goals and 7 assists throughout all competitions, and became renowned for his dangerous long throw-ins. 

After training with RCD Mallorca and Ross County in the offseason, he re-signed with Cavalry FC ahead of the 2020 season on January 29, 2020. In September 2020, Pasquotti would suffer a torn ACL in a match against Pacific FC, which would keep him out of action for 6-9 months.

Career statistics

Honours

Club
Calgary Foothills
PDL Championship: 2018
Calvary FC 
 Canadian Premier League Finals 
Runners-up: 2019
Canadian Premier League (Regular season): 
Champions: Spring 2019, Fall 2019

Individual
PDL Championship MVP: 2018

References

External links

Living people
1995 births
Association football forwards
Canadian soccer players
Soccer people from Alberta
Sportspeople from Lethbridge
Lethbridge Pronghorns players
Calgary Foothills FC players
Cavalry FC players
USL League Two players
Canadian Premier League players
Canadian people of Italian descent